Olha Bibik (born 5 February 1990) is a Ukrainian sprinter. She represented her country at the 2015 World Championships, 2016 World Indoor Championships, and 2016 Summer Olympics.

Competition record

1Disqualified in the final

References

External links

 

1990 births
Living people
Ukrainian female sprinters
Olympic female sprinters
Olympic athletes of Ukraine
Athletes (track and field) at the 2016 Summer Olympics
World Athletics Championships athletes for Ukraine
People from Kamianske
Sportspeople from Dnipropetrovsk Oblast